Recep Tayyip Erdoğan University is a state university founded on 17 March 2006 in Rize, Turkey. The university is predominantly science and health oriented. The university is a member of the Caucasus University Association.

History
The history of the university dates back to Rize Vocational School, founded on March 1, 1976. The school later continued to grow through the foundation of Faculty of Theology and the Faculty of Fisheries in 1992; and then Fındıklı Vocational School in 1996 and the Faculty of Education and Faculty of Science and Literature in 1997.

Being part of Karadeniz Technical University, the university was later chartered as Rize University with its Faculties of Fisheries, Theology, Science and Literature, Education, and Rize Vocational School (later divided into two schools).

Recep Tayyip Erdogan University continues its activities with its 3 Institutes, 13 Faculties, 5 Schools, 7 Vocational Schools, 7 Research and Application Centre, and 6 departments within rectorate.

References

External links
Recep Tayyip Erdoğan University official website

Educational institutions established in 2006
Recep Tayyip Erdoğan University
2006 establishments in Turkey
Rize
Recep Tayyip Erdoğan